Antona toxaridia is a moth of the subfamily Arctiinae first described by Herbert Druce in 1899. It is found in Ecuador.

References

Lithosiini
Moths described in 1899
Moths of South America